DJ Pied Piper and the Masters of Ceremonies were a UK garage collaboration between producer and DJ Pied Piper and the emcees MC DT (responsible for the line "we're loving it, loving it, loving it"), Melody, Sharky P and the Unknown MC (Kamanchi Sly, formerly of the group Hijack). They are best known for their number one hit song "Do You Really Like It?".

Musical career
The group's debut single "Do You Really Like It?" gained the number one spot on the UK Singles Chart for one week from 27 May to 2 June 2001. It stayed on the chart for a total of 14 weeks during the summer of 2001. The track also appears on several albums of the UK garage compilation series Pure Garage. DJ Pied Piper and the Masters of Ceremonies can occasionally be heard as guests on DJ EZ's weekly UKG show on Kiss 100.

In 2002, a mashup of "Do You Really Like It?" and Jammin's "Kinda Funky" titled "Kinda Wicked" was released on white label.

Discography

Singles

References

External links
DJ Pied Piper and the Masters of Ceremonies on Spotify
MC DT Official website

English dance music groups
UK garage groups
Musical groups established in 2000
Musical groups from the London Borough of Lambeth
Black British musical groups
Relentless Records artists